Osama Mohammad El-Fezzani (born 23 February 1978) is a Libyan football attacker.

Clubs
 Al Ahly Tripoli
 Al Madina Tripoli
 Rafik Sorman

External links
 
 

1978 births
Living people
Libyan footballers
Libya international footballers
Place of birth missing (living people)
Al-Ahli SC (Tripoli) players
Association football forwards
Libyan Premier League players
21st-century Libyan people
Rafik Sorman players
Al-Madina SC players
East Riffa Club players
Al-Wehdat SC players
Nejmeh SC players
Libyan expatriate footballers
Expatriate footballers in Bahrain
Expatriate footballers in Lebanon
Expatriate footballers in Jordan